The National Olympic Committee of Thailand under the Royal Patronage of His Majesty the King is the national Olympic committee in Thailand for the Olympic Games movement, based in Ampawan House, Bangkok, Thailand. It is a non-profit organisation that selects teams and raises funds to send Thailand competitors to Olympic events organised by the International Olympic Committee (IOC), Asian Games events organised by the Olympic Council of Asia (OCA) and Southeast Asian Games events organised by the Southeast Asian Games Federation (SEAGF).

History
The forerunner of the NOCT was the "International Relations Committee for Sports" which was set up in 1946, originally a society for expatriates living in Thailand to participate in sports, and raise money through ticket sales for public sports participation and the Thai Red Cross Society.

The Committee decided to create an official Olympic organization to help develop good relations with other nations via sport, and the NOCT was officially formed on June 20, 1948; and subsequently recognized by the International Olympic Committee at the IOC meeting in Copenhagen on May 15, 1950. His Majesty King Bhumibol Adulyadej (Rama IX) granted a Royal Patronage to the NOCT on December 26, 1949, as well as the official Symbol of the Olympic Committee of Thailand on January 8, 1951.

Governance

Executive Board

President

National Governing Body Members

Supervised members

Recognized members

See also
Thailand at the Olympics
Thailand at the Paralympics
Thailand at the Asian Games

References

External links 
National Olympic Committee of Thailand 

Thailand
Oly
Thailand at the Olympics
1948 establishments in Thailand
Sports organizations established in 1948
Organizations based in Thailand under royal patronage